Sir George Frederick Harvey  (1 February 1806 – 22 January 1876), Scottish painter.

Early life
He was the son of George Harvey, a watchmaker, and Elizabeth (née Jeffrey) Harvey, and was born at 59 Main Street, St Ninians, a small village near Stirling. His brother was Bailie Harvey was long active in Glasgow municipal affairs.

Soon after his birth his parents removed to Stirling, where George was apprenticed to Mr McLaren, a bookseller on Bow Street. His love for art having, however, become very decided, in his eighteenth year he entered the Trustees' Academy on Picardy Place in Edinburgh. Here he so distinguished himself that in 1826 he was invited by the Scottish artists, who had resolved to found a Scottish Academy, to join it as an associate (see Royal Scottish Academy).

Career
Harvey's first picture, "A Village School," was exhibited in 1826 at the Edinburgh Institution; and from the time of the opening of the Academy in the following year he continued annually to exhibit. His best-known pictures are those depicting historical episodes in religious history from a puritan or evangelical point of view, such as "Covenanters' Preaching," "Covenanters' Communion," "John Bunyan and his Blind Daughter," "Sabbath Evening," and the "Quitting of the Manse."

He was, however, equally popular in Scotland for subjects not directly religious; and "The Bowlers," "A Highland Funeral," "The Curlers," "A Schule Skailin'," and "Children Blowing Bubbles in the Church-yard of Greyfriars', Edinburgh," manifest the same close observation of character, artistic conception and conscientious elaboration of details. In "The Night Mail" and "Dawn Revealing the New World to Columbus" the aspects of nature are, made use of in different ways, but with equal happiness, to lend impressiveness and solemnity to human concerns. He also painted landscapes and portraits.

In 1829 he was elected a fellow of the Royal Scottish Academy; in 1864 he succeeded Sir John Watson Gordon as president, a role which he held until 1876. He was knighted in 1867.

Published works
Sir George Harvey was the author of a paper on the "Colour of the Atmosphere," read before the Edinburgh Royal Society, and afterwards published with illustrations in Good Words; and in 1870 he published a small volume entitled Notes of the Early History of the Royal Scottish Academy. Selections from the Works of Sir George Harvey, PRSA, described by the Rev. AL Simpson, FSA Scot., and photographed by Thomas Annan, appeared at Edinburgh in 1869.

Personal life

He was married firstly to Eliza Margaret Carstairs (1818-1844) in 1839. Before her death, they were the parents of two daughters: Ellen Harvey and Elizabeth Harvey, neither of whom married.

After her death in 1844, he married, secondly, to Margaret Muir (1805–1854), a daughter of Helen (née Macfie) Muir, in 1847. She died in August 1854. His niece Nellie (or Nelly) Harvey (1865–1949) was also a painter.

He died at 21 Regent Terrace in Edinburgh on 22 January 1876. He is buried in Warriston Cemetery against the east wall, in the overgrown area just south of the former east gate.

Gallery

References
Notes

Sources

External links
44 works by George Harvey at The National Galleries Scotland

National Gallery of Victoria

1806 births
1876 deaths
People from Stirling
Knights Bachelor
Royal Scottish Academicians
19th-century Scottish painters
Scottish male painters
Scottish knights
Fellows of the Royal Society of Edinburgh
Burials at Warriston Cemetery
People educated at Stirling High School
Alumni of the Edinburgh College of Art
19th-century Scottish historians